Miss Venezuela 2000 was the 47th Miss Venezuela pageant, was held in Caracas, Venezuela, on September 8, 2000, after weeks of events.  The winner of the pageant was Eva Ekvall, Miss Apure.

The pageant was broadcast live on Venevision from the Poliedro de Caracas in Caracas, Venezuela. At the conclusion of the final night of competition, outgoing titleholder Martina Thorogood crowned Eva Ekvall of Apure as the new Miss Venezuela.

Results

Special awards
 Miss Photogenic (voted by press reporters) – Eva Ekvall (Miss Apure)
 Miss Internet (voted by www.missvenezuela.com viewers) – Eva Ekvall (Miss Apure)
 Miss Congeniality (voted by Miss Venezuela contestants) – Ainett Stephens (Miss Bolívar)
 Miss Figure – Verónica Hernández (Miss Monagas)
 Best Smile – Zonia El Hawi (Miss Nueva Esparta)
 Best Face – Felisa Gómez(Miss Lara)
 Best Skin – Verónica Leal (Miss Trujillo)
 Best Runway – Bianca Urdaneta (Miss Mérida)
 Miss Integral – Isis Durán (Miss Táchira)

Delegates
The Miss Venezuela 2000 delegates are:

Notes
Eva Ekvall placed as 3rd runner-up in Miss Universe 2001 in Bayamón, Puerto Rico. She died on December 17, 2011, victim of breast cancer.
Vivian Urdaneta won Miss International 2000 in Tokyo, Japan.
Ligia Petit won Reina Sudamericana 2000 in Santa Cruz, Bolivia, and later won Miss Intercontinental 2001 in Coburg, Germany. She also placed as 1st runner up in Miss Atlántico Internacional 2001 in Punta del Este, Uruguay.
Mariangélica García placed as semifinalist in Miss Tourism World 2002 in Antalya, Turkey.
Natascha Borger won Miss Germany 2002 and placed as semifinalist in Miss Universe 2002 in San Juan, Puerto Rico. She also placed as semifinalist in Miss International 2004 in Beijing, China (she represented Germany). She also was 1st. runner-up in Miss Europe 2002.
Fabiola Borges previously placed as 2nd runner up in Miss Intercontinental 2000 in Kaiserslautern, Germany.

References

External links
Miss Venezuela official website

2000 in Venezuela
2000 beauty pageants